The Deutscher Schwimmsport-Verband (DSSV) was the governing body for swim sports in East Germany (GDR). It was an organ of the larger Deutscher Turn- und Sportbund, which was a mass organization that oversaw all sports associations in the GDR. In 1988 the organization had 83,509 registered athletes and 6,911 trainers. Shortly after German reunification the remnants of the DSSV were absorbed by the various swimming associations of the West German states.

References

Sports governing bodies in East Germany
Sports organizations established in 1958
Organizations disestablished in 1990
1958 establishments in East Germany
1990 disestablishments in Germany